Caetano Lima dos Santos, O.F.M. Cap. (26 October 1916 – 11 November 2014) was a Brazilian bishop of the Roman Catholic Church.

Lima dos Santos was born in Altamira, Brazil in October 1916. He was ordained a priest on December 15, 1940 from the Order of Friars Minor Capuchin, and appointed bishop of the Diocese of Roman Ilhéus on April 16, 1958 and ordained bishop August 10, 1958. He resigned as bishop of Ilhéus December 16, 1969 and was then appointed Titular Bishop of Tagarbala, from which he resigned sometime the next year. With the agreement of the Pope, he returned to the secular state and married Sister Maria Vila Boas de Almeida, with whom he fell in love.

References

External links
Catholic Hierarchy
Order of Friars Minor Capuchin

1916 births
2014 deaths
20th-century Roman Catholic bishops in Brazil
Capuchin bishops
Laicized Roman Catholic bishops
Participants in the Second Vatican Council
People from Pará
Roman Catholic bishops of Ilhéus